Pierre Lavenant (born 3 August 1995) is a French professional footballer who plays as an attacking midfielder for Championnat National 2 club Les Herbiers.

Club career

Lavenant began playing football with hometown side Saint-Malo in 2001, and spent 10 years there before joining the Lorient academy in July 2011.

Lavenant made his professional debut for Lorient on 29 October 2013, playing all 90 minutes in a 2–0 Coupe de la Ligue defeat at the hands of Nantes in the third round. On 8 January 2014, he signed his first professional contract with Lorient, committing himself to the club for three seasons.

Ahead of the 2020–21 season, Lavenant moved to Belgian National Division 1 club Francs Borains. In January 2022, he signed for French club Les Herbiers.

International career
Lavenant has represented France at under-18 and under-19 level.

International

References

External links
 
 

1995 births
Living people
Sportspeople from Saint-Malo
French footballers
Association football midfielders
Footballers from Brittany
France youth international footballers
US Saint-Malo players
FC Lorient players
CS Sedan Ardennes players
US Avranches players
Vannes OC players
Francs Borains players
Les Herbiers VF players
Championnat National 2 players
Championnat National 3 players
Ligue 1 players
Belgian Third Division players
French expatriate footballers
Expatriate footballers in Belgium
French expatriate sportspeople in Belgium